Yves Pascal Oswald (born 11 February 1980 in Müstair) is a Swiss skeleton racer who has competed since 2003. His best World Cup finish was 12th in the men's event at Winterberg in November 2008.

Oswald qualified for the 2010 Winter Olympics in place of injured Gregor Stähli, the defending world champion. He finished 16th.

References
 

1980 births
Living people
Olympic skeleton racers of Switzerland
Skeleton racers at the 2010 Winter Olympics
Swiss male skeleton racers